

Qualifying Criteria 
An NOC may enter up to 3 athletes per weapon (épée, foil, or sabre) for the weapons in which there is a team event and up to 2 athletes per weapon for other weapons.

For each team event there will be 8 qualified teams plus a team from the Host Nation if applicable. The teams will qualify as follows:
 Fédération Internationale d'Escrime (FIE) Official Team Ranking as of March 31, 2008 (best 4 teams)
 Highest ranked team from each zone (America, Europe, Asia/Oceania, Africa) outside top 4 in FIE Team Ranking (4 teams)

For each individual event (weapons which have a team event) there will be 39 qualified athletes as follows:
 All athletes qualified for team competition (24 athletes)
 The 3 highest ranked athletes in the FIE Individual adjusted official ranking (AOR) (3 athletes)
 The 7 highest ranked athletes from FIE Individual AOR by zone (Europe 2, America 2, Asia/Oceania 2, Africa 1) - 1 per NOC
 The 5 highest ranked athletes from zonal qualifying events (Europe 2, America 1, Asia/Oceania 1, Africa 1) - 1 per NOC

For the remaining individual events there will be 24 qualified athletes as follows:
 The first 8 from the FIE Individual Ranking
 The first 8 from the FIE Individual AOR by zone (Europe 3, America 2, Asia/Oceania 2, Africa 1) - 1 athlete per country
 The first 8 from zonal qualifying events (Europe 3, America 2, Asia/Oceania 2, Africa 1) - 1 per NOC, open only for NOCs not qualified as mentioned above

Summary

Men

Épée

Team Competition:

The first four teams in the FIE team ranking:
The highest-ranked team from each zone:
Africa: 
Asia-Oceania: 
America: 
Europe: 
Invitational:
Host:  ^

^ China received two additional places for team event.

Foil

Sabre

Team Competition:

The first four teams in the FIE team ranking:
The highest-ranked team from each zone:
Africa: 
Asia-Oceania: 
America: 
Europe:

Women

Épée

Foil

Team Competition:

The first four teams in the FIE team ranking:
The highest-ranked team from each zone:
Africa: 
Asia-Oceania: 
America: 
Europe:

Sabre

Team Competition:

The first four teams in the FIE team ranking:
The highest-ranked team from each zone:
Africa: 
Asia-Oceania: 
America: 
Europe: 

 * The host country will have the right to enter 8 fencers, to be distributed between team and individual events as it sees fit: thus, it could enter teams, or have no team and select for only the individual events. Any places unused by the host country of the 2008 Olympic Games in Beijing will be reallocated by the Tripartite Commission (IOC, NOC, FIE)

References 
Qualifications for the 2008 OG
Federation Internationale D'Escrime

Qualification for the 2008 Summer Olympics